Max Benjamin Rowland Hill,  (born 1964) is the Director of Public Prosecutions for England and Wales, succeeding Alison Saunders as from 1 November 2018. Previously, he was the Independent Reviewer of Terrorism Legislation in the United Kingdom, replacing David Anderson in 2017.

Early life 

Hill was born in Hertfordshire in 1964. After attending state primary schools, he was educated at the Royal Grammar School, Newcastle upon Tyne due to his family moving to Northumberland. He won a scholarship to study law at St Peter's College, Oxford, from 1983 to 1986.

Career 
Called to the Bar by Middle Temple in 1987, Hill worked on parts of the Damilola Taylor murder trials and 7 July 2005 London bombings before being appointed a Queen's Counsel (QC) in 2008. 

From 2012, he was Head of Chambers at Red Lion Chambers and was chaired the Criminal Bar Association 2011 to 2012. Hill also served as Leader of the South Eastern Circuit from 2014 to 2016.

In 2017, he appeared in Channel 4's The Trial as lead counsel for the prosecution, in which real juries, together with actual barristers and judges, tried a fictional murder case in order to explore the workings of the jury system. 

From 1 March 2017 to 12 October 2018, Hill was the Independent Reviewer of Terrorism Legislation.

Director of Public Prosecutions 
Hill was appointed as the Director of Public Prosecutions in November 2018.  In this role, Hill has supported the idea that too many children are facing adult justice, arguing that 10 is too young an age for criminal responsibility.

References

External links 

Max Hill QC takes up post as Director of Public Prosecutions

1963 births
Living people
English King's Counsel
People educated at the Royal Grammar School, Newcastle upon Tyne
Alumni of St Peter's College, Oxford
British barristers
Directors of Public Prosecutions (England and Wales)
21st-century King's Counsel